Walter Hampton Godwin (June 15, 1898 – May 18, 1953) was an American football player in the National Football League. He played for the Staten Island Stapletons. He played collegiately for the Georgia Tech football team.

References

1898 births
1953 deaths
American football offensive guards
Georgia Tech Yellow Jackets football players
Staten Island Stapletons players
All-Southern college football players
All-American college football players

External links